Persíguelas y alcanzalas is a 1969 Mexican film written by Luis Alcoriza.

External links
 

1969 films
Mexican crime comedy films
1960s Spanish-language films
1960s Mexican films